West Morgan High School is a public high school at 261 South Greenway Drive in Trinity, Alabama. It is part of the Morgan County Schools. In 2021 it had 375 students in grades 9-12.

Built in 1961, the school is the home to the Rebels. The team colors are maroon and gray.

In 2022 the school's student body was about 59 percent White, 33 percent Hispanic, and 6.4 percent Black.

See also
List of high schools in Alabama

References

Public middle schools in Alabama
Public high schools in Alabama
Educational institutions established in 1966
Schools in Morgan County, Alabama
1966 establishments in Alabama